Thick as Thieves is the fourth studio album by Canadian rock band Trooper, released in 1978. The album was produced by Randy Bachman of Bachman–Turner Overdrive and The Guess Who fame. The album went platinum in their home country, and featured the group's only successful U.S. single, "Raise a Little Hell".

Overview
Thick as Thieves contained the hits “Raise a Little Hell”, "Round, Round We Go" written and sung by keyboardist Frank Ludwig, and "The Moment That it Takes" written by Stewart and Underhill and also sung by Ludwig.

Track listing
All songs written by Ra McGuire and Brian Smith unless otherwise noted.
 "Live from the Moon" (4:14)
 "No Fun Being Alone" (3:17)
 "Round, Round We Go" (4:18) (Frank Ludwig)
 "Drivin' Crazy" (3:19)
 "Roll with It" (4:09)
 "Say Goodnight" (3:51)
 "The Moment That It Takes" (3:19) (Tommy Stewart/Doni Underhill)
 "One Good Reason" (5:14)
 "Gambler" (3:18)
 "Raise a Little Hell" (3:41)

CD bonus track
"A Fine Mess (You've Gotten Us Into)"  [b-side to Raise A Little Hell single]

Personnel 

 Ra McGuire - lead vocals
 Brian Smith - lead guitar
 Tommy Stewart - drums
 Doni Underhill - bass guitar
 Frank Ludwig - keyboards, vocals

Singles

 "Raise A Little Hell" / "A Fine Mess (You've Gotten Us Into)"
 "Round, Round We Go" / "Raise A Little Hell"
 "The Moment That It Takes" / "Live From The Moon"

References

Trooper (band) albums
1978 albums